Calling for Love (Chinese: 呼叫大明星, pinyin: Hūjiào Dà Míngxīng) is a 2010 Taiwanese drama starring Charlene Choi, Mike He, Chen Zhi Kai and Zhou Cai Shi. It was produced by Comic Ritz International Production (可米瑞智國際藝能有限公司) with Chai Zhi Ping (柴智屏) as producer and directed by Lin He Long (林合隆).

The series was first broadcast in Taiwan on free-to-air Chinese Television System (CTS) from May 16 to August 15, 2010 every Sunday at 22:00-23:00. On October 18 then "Purple Rose" aired after was not approved by the mainland side quasi broadcast license late, and eventually replaced by the "Sweetheart", "starlight fairy". May 16, 2010, broadcast on CTS.

Cast
 Charlene Choi as Chen De Xing 陳德馨
 Mike He as Bo Ye 柏野
 Chen Zhi Kai as Zhong Wei Li 鍾威力
 Tracy Chou as Yang Wei Chen 楊惟晨
 Li Shengn (李晟) as Bo Rou 柏柔
 David Wang (王耀慶) as Lin Qin Hong 林親雄
 Zhang Yu as Jack
 Xie Zheng Hao as Ke Fan 克凡
 Na Wei Xun as Wei De Zhi 魏得志
 Riva Chang as Mei Mi 美咪
 Ba Yu as Xiu Na 秀娜
 Hong Hai Ling (熊海靈) as Wei Chen's mother
 Xie Qi Wen (謝其文) as Lao Wen 老溫
 Jiang Hou Ren (姜厚任) as Yang Qin Tai 楊慶泰
 Chen You Fang as Lou Lou 露露
 Wang Kai (王凱) as Wang Rui 王瑞
 Xiang Yu Jie as Ms. Ho 何小姐
 Liu Huan (劉媛) as Yan Ni 閻妮
 Jiang Chao as Shi Te Long 史特龍
 Xiao Jian as Xi Wei 席維
 Lin Shou Jun (林秀君) as Wei Li's mother
 Huang Tai An as Motorist (ep1)

References

External links
 Comic Ritz Calling for Love website 
 Official website 
 Official blog 

2010 Taiwanese television series debuts
2010 Taiwanese television series endings
Chinese Television System original programming